Tierra Umi Wilson (born February 9, 1999) is an American singer and songwriter. Born in Seattle, Washington, she attended the University of Southern California, but dropped out in 2019 in order to pursue music. She is best known for her 2018 song "Remember Me", which has over 130 million streams on Spotify. She also accompanied Conan Gray as an opening act on his Comfort Crowd Tour in 2019.

Early life
Wilson was born in Seattle in 1999 to an African-American father and a Japanese mother. Her mother taught her how to read, write, and speak Japanese. Wilson's mother plays piano and her father plays the drums. UMI started writing music when she was 4 or 5, with a songwriting journal. Throughout high school, she was involved in DECA (Distributive Education Clubs of America) and her track team at Tahoma High School in Maple Valley. In high school, she discovered YouTube beats and started writing to tracks. She would record the songs with a USB mic and upload them to SoundCloud and YouTube. She soon started to get copyrighted on SoundCloud by posting covers of other songs. This made her start writing and posting her own originals.

Career

2017–2018: Happy Again and debut EP
In 2017, UMI released five singles before their four-track debut EP, Interlude. This led to making it onto Spotify’s Fresh Finds Best of 2017 playlist. She opened for rapper ODIE in Los Angeles.

UMI's most popular release to date is "Remember Me". She has over 33 million views on YouTube and 117 million plays on Spotify. UMI debuted "Remember Me" with a music video, highlighting universalism by portraying couples of different race, class, and sexual orientation. She said, "the message in the video, for me, is that no matter who you love or how you love, we all hurt the same in the end."

2019–2021: Balance, Love Language, Introspection EP, and Introspection Reimagined
She released the Balance EP on May 17, 2019, which included the songs "Ordinary" and "Down To Earth." On October 30, 2019, they released their EP, Love Language On June 21, 2020, she released her EP, Introspection. Following the release of her EP, Introspection, UMI released a follow-up EP entitled Introspection Reimagined on March 26, 2021, featuring new versions of the songs on the Introspection EP as well as two new interludes.

2022–present: Forest in the City debut album and tour
On May 26, 2022, Umi released her debut album, Forest in the City, which featured the singles "Moonlit Room", "Whatever U Like", and "Sorry", and was the focus of her first headlining tour.

Artistry

UMI has cited her biggest musical influences as Frank Ocean, D'Angelo, Jhené Aiko, Erykah Badu and SZA. She grew up listening to R&B, soul, gospel and Japanese pop/rock. UMI has been described by Vogue as having a "lo-fi, alternative, laid back, R&B style".

Discography

Studio albums

Extended plays

Singles

As a lead artist

As a featured artist

Promotional singles

References

External links
 

1999 births
American child singers
21st-century African-American women singers
American contemporary R&B singers
American hip hop singers
American dance musicians
American women pop singers
American musicians of Japanese descent
Child pop musicians
Living people
Musicians from Seattle
African-American women singer-songwriters
Singer-songwriters from Washington (state)